George Patrick McGuigan (born 30 March 1993) is an English rugby union player who plays for Gloucester in Premiership Rugby. His position is Hooker and has represented England Saxons as well as Ireland U18s, U20s on several occasions.  Between 2016–2018 he played 35 times for Leicester Tigers.

Club career

McGuigan was born in Richmond, North Yorkshire and first played rugby for Richmond' High School, before moving to Newcastle to further continue his rugby career at Gosforth Academy. McGuigan was part of the Newcastle Falcons academy scheme which saw several Falcons academy players link up with the school to continue their studies and academy training during post-16.

He became a member of the first team squad after joining the club professionally in 2011. On 4 February 2014, McGuigan signed a two-year contract extension with Newcastle until the summer of 2016.  In February 2016, McGuigan signed a contract to join Leicester Tigers from the 2016-17 season.

On 21 April 2018, McGuigan re-signed with his hometown club Newcastle Falcons from the 2018-19 season.

On 12 December 2022, McGuigan left Newcastle with immediate effect to join Premiership rivals Gloucester on a long-term deal.

International career

Ireland U18
After successfully completing trials in 2010 McGuigan was selected to represent the Ireland U18 squad.

Ireland U20
On 1 February 2013 McGuigan made his debut against Wales, creating several try-scoring opportunities as well as injuring himself in the process, only to carry on and make a match saving tackle in his own final third.

England Saxons
McGuigan was called up by England Saxons for their 2016 tour to South Africa where he played two matches from the bench.

England Senior
In June 2022 he was called up by Eddie Jones to join a training camp with the senior England squad.

References

External links
 

1993 births
Living people
Irish rugby union players
Rugby union hookers
Sportspeople from North Yorkshire
Leicester Tigers players
Irish Exiles rugby union players
Rugby union players from Yorkshire